Open All Night is the tenth solo studio album by the British singer/songwriter Marc Almond. It was released by Blue Star Music in March 1999.

Background
Following the moderate success of Fantastic Star Almond left his record label and released Open All Night on Blue Star Music, an independent label he founded for the purpose. The album features collaborations with Siouxsie Sioux and Budgie (from The Creatures) on the track "Threat of Love" and with Kelli Ali, who was at that time the lead vocalist of the band Sneaker Pimps, on the track "Almost Diamonds". "Tragedy", "Black Kiss" and "My Love" were released as singles, but they did not chart.

The American release of the album came with the bonus track "Beautiful Losers".

Critical reception

The NME describe the songs on Open All Night as inhabiting "an evocative Brel-meets-Barry landscape" with a "midnight blue melancholy". Touching on similar themes the review from Hot Press describes Open All Night's "lush decadence and tragic dissolution".  Elsewhere, reviewer Keith Phipps in his review for The A.V. Club magazine states that "Almond's songs have a creepy, dark quality" on this album.

Track listing
 "Night & Dark" (Marc Almond, Neal Whitmore) – 6:10
 "Bedroom Shrine" (Almond, Oskar Paul) – 4:32
 "Tragedy (Take a Look and See)" (Almond, Whitmore) – 5:01
 "Black Kiss" (Almond, Whitmore) – 3:35
 "Almost Diamonds" (Almond, Whitmore, Kelli Ali) – 5:16
 Guest Appearance Kelli Ali
 "Scarlet Bedroom" (Almond, John Green) – 3:06
 "My Love" (Almond, Whitmore) – 3:45
 "Heart in Velvet" (Almond, Whitmore) – 4:14
 "Open All Night" (Almond, Whitmore) – 5:20
 "Threat of Love" (Almond, Whitmore) – 4:41
 Guest Appearance: The Creatures (Siouxsie Sioux and Budgie)
 "Bad People Kiss" (Almond, Douglass) – 3:34
 "Sleepwalker" (Almond, Whitmore) – 4:19
 "Midnight Soul" (Almond) – 3:51

Bonus track (in USA)
 "Beautiful Losers" (Almond)  – 4:57

Personnel
Marc Almond – vocals and vocal arrangements
Neal X – guitar, effects, additional programming and assistant production
Glen Scott – Hammond organ, Wurlitzer, piano and keyboards
John Green – extra keyboards, string keyboards, pre-production and demo programming
Rick May – bass and double bass
Bill Miskimmin – harmonica
Oliver Langford – violin
Vladimir Asriev – violin
Igor Outkine – accordion
Elliott Douglass – piano
Henrique da Silva – macumba voice
Jorge Batista – congas, bongos, Brazilian percussion and Orisha chant
Esteve Dasilva – Brazilian percussion
Hossam Ramzy – Egyptian percussion
Tim Sanders – tenor saxophone
Roddy Lorimer – trumpet
Simon Clarke – alto saxophone
Rebecca S Doe – string arrangement
Oliver Kraus – cello
Lucy Wilkins – violin
Sophie Sirota – viola
Ann-Marie Gilkes – backing vocals
Angela Morel – backing vocals
M Stewart – backing vocals
Richard Wayler – backing vocals

References

1999 albums
Marc Almond albums